Pietro Bronzini (8 January 1898 – 21 February 1962) was an Italian professional footballer who played as a midfielder.

External links 
Profile at MagliaRossonera.it 

1898 births
1962 deaths
Italian footballers
Association football midfielders
Inter Milan players
A.C. Milan players